This list of Brigham Young University-Idaho alumni includes notable graduates, non-graduate former students, and current students of Brigham Young University–Idaho (also known as BYU–Idaho or BYU–I), a four-year private college owned by the Church of Jesus Christ of Latter-day Saints (LDS Church) located in Rexburg, Idaho, United States that prior to 2001 was a two-year junior college known as Ricks College.  As of August 2008, BYU–Idaho/Ricks College had approximately 150,000 alumni. Many of them, in particular those before 2001, graduated with a two-year associate's degree or simply attended two years before moving on to another institution to complete their bachelor's degree.

Business and finance

Educators and scholars

Entertainment and media

Government, law, and public policy

Other

Religion 
Note: All positions listed are within the Church of Jesus Christ of Latter-day Saints unless otherwise noted.

Sports

Writers and artists

References

Notes 
 Blank cells indicate missing information; em-dashes (—) indicate that the alumnus attended but never graduated from BYU–Idaho.

External links 

 BYU–Idaho Alumni Association
 Alumni and Friends News

 
Brigham Young University–Idaho
Brigham Young University-Idaho alumni
Brigham